Yi Tung Shan (Chinese: 二東山) is the ninth highest mountain in Hong Kong. It is situated east of Sunset Peak on Lantau Island, and is 747 m in height. Stage 2 of The Lantau Trail runs along the north side of its peak.

Name
While Sunset Peak's Cantonese name Tai Tung Shan literally means "Big East Mountain", Yi Tung Shan (Chinese: 二東山; Jyutping: Ji6 Tung1 Saan1) literally means "Second East Mountain".

See also

List of mountains, peaks and hills in Hong Kong
Sunset Peak
Lantau Peak
Lantau Trail

References
Lantau Island
Mountains, peaks and hills of Hong Kong